Koubewel Koundia  is a rural commune in the Cercle of Douentza in the Mopti Region of Mali. The commune contains 14 villages and had a population of 13,529 in the 2009 census. The main village (chef-lieu) is Koubewel.

References

External links
.
.

Communes of Mopti Region